Rockhaven is a special service area in the Rural Municipality of Cut Knife No. 439, Saskatchewan, Canada. It held village status prior to December 31, 2007. The population was 20 people in 2006. The community is located 56 km west of the City of North Battleford between Highway 40 and Highway 787 southeast of Cut Knife on the Canadian Pacific Railway line.

Demographics 

See also 
 List of communities in Saskatchewan
 List of hamlets in Saskatchewan

References 

Cut Knife No. 439, Saskatchewan
Designated places in Saskatchewan
Former villages in Saskatchewan
Special service areas in Saskatchewan
Populated places disestablished in 2007
Division No. 13, Saskatchewan